Gennie Nevinson is an Australian actress. She is notable for her appearances in Muriel's Wedding. She also appeared as Eva, part of a kidnapping gang in the hard-hitting British police drama The Professionals; episode The Acorn Syndrome (1980), and in the first two series of Minder, in the part of Terry's girlfriend Penny.

Biography 
Born Rima J. C. Hoyes-Cock in 1951, Gennie Nevinson is the daughter of the late actress Nancy Nevinson, (Nee Ezekiel) and sister of two brothers, one of whom is the actor Nigel Nevinson. Gennie's father Commander William Hoyes-Cock met her mother while Nancy was touring with the ENSA.

Nevinson lives in New South Wales with her second husband.

Filmography

Television

Film

Commercials

References

External links

Living people
Australian film actresses
Year of birth missing (living people)